St. Lina or Ste-Lina in French, is a hamlet in northern Alberta, Canada within the County of St. Paul No. 19. It is home of St. Lina Community Hall.

History 

On 20 August 1856 Father Malsonneuve set out with four men to open a trail from Lac La Biche by way of Sugden, Ste-Lina and St-Vincent.  None of these hamlets were named at the time.  The trail soon became a route for the hauling of supplies to northern points on the Athabasca River.

The trail wended its way passing east of the present hamlet of Mallaig.  The Lac La Biche trail wends its way in a north-westerly direction past a farm owned in 1978 by W. Christensen and north to cross a creek just east of Ste-Lina.  A camp was set up for travellers and to water horses before proceeding further.

As white settlers traveled this part of Canada and relayed information back East of the furs and timber in the area, the population grew. Surveyors mapped out the land, and it was opened to homesteaders for a nominal fee of $10.00 with certain requirements. St. Lina was named and became a hamlet as well as Goodridge, Beaver River, Sugden, Boyne Lake,  McRae and Ashmont.

Climate

Demographics 
St. Lina recorded a population of 24 in the 1991 Census of Population conducted by Statistics Canada.

See also 
List of communities in Alberta
List of hamlets in Alberta

References 

Hamlets in Alberta
County of St. Paul No. 19